Rupert Chawner Brooke (3 August 1887 – 23 April 1915) was an English poet known for his idealistic war sonnets written during the First World War, especially "The Soldier". He was also known for his boyish good looks, which were said to have prompted the Irish poet W. B. Yeats to describe him as "the handsomest young man in England".

Early life

Brooke was born at 5 Hillmorton Road, Rugby, Warwickshire, and named after a great-grandfather on his mother's side, Rupert Chawner (1750–1836), a distinguished doctor descended from the regicide Thomas Chaloner (the middle name has however sometimes been erroneously given as "Chaucer"). He was the third of four children of William Parker "Willie" Brooke, a schoolmaster (teacher), and Ruth Mary Brooke, née Cotterill, a school matron. Both parents were working at Fettes College in Edinburgh when they met. They married on 18 December 1879. William Parker Brooke had to resign after the couple wed as there was no accommodation there for married masters. The couple then moved to Rugby in Warwickshire where Rupert's father became Master of School Field House at Rugby School a month later. His eldest brother was Richard England "Dick" Brooke (1881–1907), his sister Edith Marjorie Brooke was born in 1885 and died the following year, and his youngest brother was William Alfred Cotterill "Podge" Brooke (1891–1915).

Brooke attended preparatory (prep) school locally at Hillbrow, and then went on to Rugby School. At Rugby he was romantically involved with fellow pupils Charles Lascelles, Denham Russell-Smith and Michael Sadleir. In 1905, he became friends with St. John Lucas, who thereafter became something of a mentor to him.

In October 1906 he went up to King's College, Cambridge to study classics. There he became a member of the Apostles, was elected as president of the university Fabian Society, helped found the Marlowe Society drama club and acted, including in the Cambridge Greek Play. The friendships he made at school and university set the course for his adult life, and many of the people he met—including George Mallory—fell under his spell. Virginia Woolf told Vita Sackville-West that she had gone skinny-dipping with Brooke in a moonlit pool when they were in Cambridge together. In 1907, his older brother Dick died of pneumonia at age 26. Brooke planned to put his studies on hold to help his parents cope with the loss of his brother, but they insisted he return to university.

There is a blue plaque at The Orchard where he lived and wrote. The words read  thus« Rupert Brooke Poet & Soldier 1887-1915 Lived and wrote at The Orchard 1909–1911, and at The Old Vicarage 1911-1912 »

Life and career

Brooke made friends among the Bloomsbury group of writers, some of whom admired his talent while others were more impressed by his good looks. He also belonged to another literary group known as the Georgian Poets and was one of the most important of the Dymock poets, associated with the Gloucestershire village of Dymock where he spent some time before the war. This group included both Robert Frost and Edward Thomas. He also lived at the Old Vicarage, Grantchester, which stimulated one of his best-known poems, named after the house, written with homesickness while in Berlin in 1912. While travelling in Europe he prepared a thesis, entitled "John Webster and the Elizabethan Drama", which earned him a fellowship at King's College, Cambridge, in March 1913.

Brooke had his first heterosexual relationship with Élisabeth van Rysselberghe, daughter of painter Théo van Rysselberghe. They met in 1911 in Munich. His affair with Elisabeth came closest to be consummated than any other he ever had so far. It is possible that the two became lovers in a "complete sense" in May 1913 in Swanley. It was in Munich, where he had met Elisabeth, that a year later he finally succeeded in having intercourse with Ka Cox (Katherine Laird Cox).

Brooke suffered a severe emotional crisis in 1912, caused by sexual confusion (he was bisexual) and jealousy, resulting in the breakdown of his long relationship with Ka Cox. Brooke's paranoia that Lytton Strachey had schemed to destroy his relationship with Cox by encouraging her to see Henry Lamb precipitated his break with his Bloomsbury group friends and played a part in his nervous collapse and subsequent rehabilitation trips to Germany.

As part of his recuperation, Brooke toured the United States and Canada to write travel diaries for the Westminster Gazette. He took the long way home, sailing across the Pacific and staying some months in the South Seas. Much later it was revealed that he may have fathered a daughter with a Tahitian woman named Taatamata with whom he seems to have enjoyed his most complete emotional relationship. Many more people were in love with him. Brooke was romantically involved with the artist Phyllis Gardner and the actress Cathleen Nesbitt, and was once engaged to Noël Olivier, whom he met, when she was aged 15, at the progressive Bedales School.

Brooke enlisted at the outbreak of war in August 1914. He came to public attention as a war poet early the following year, when The Times Literary Supplement published two sonnets ("IV: The Dead" and "V: The Soldier") on 11 March; the latter was then read from the pulpit of St Paul's Cathedral on Easter Sunday (4 April).  Brooke's most famous collection of poetry, containing all five sonnets, 1914 & Other Poems, was first published in May 1915 and, in testament to his popularity, ran to 11 further impressions that year and by June 1918 had reached its 24th impression; a process undoubtedly fuelled through posthumous interest.

Brooke's accomplished poetry gained many enthusiasts and followers, and he was taken up by Edward Marsh, who brought him to the attention of Winston Churchill, then First Lord of the Admiralty. Brooke was commissioned into the Royal Naval Volunteer Reserve as a temporary sub-lieutenant shortly after his 27th birthday and took part in the Royal Naval Division's Antwerp expedition in October 1914.

Death

Brooke sailed with the British Mediterranean Expeditionary Force on 28 February 1915 but developed a severe gastroenteritis whilst stationed in Egypt followed by streptococcal sepsis from an infected mosquito bite. French surgeons carried out two operations to drain the abscess but he died of septicaemia at 4:46 pm on 23 April 1915, on the French hospital ship Duguay-Trouin, moored in a bay off the Greek island of Skyros in the Aegean Sea, while on his way to the landings at Gallipoli. As the expeditionary force had orders to depart immediately, Brooke was buried at 11 pm in an olive grove on Skyros. The site was chosen by his close friend, William Denis Browne, who wrote of Brooke's death:

Another friend and war poet, Patrick Shaw-Stewart, assisted at his hurried funeral. His grave remains there still, with a monument erected by his friend Stanley Casson, poet and archaeologist, who in 1921 published Rupert Brooke and Skyros, a "quiet essay", illustrated with woodcuts by Phyllis Gardner.

Brooke's surviving brother, William Alfred Cotterill Brooke, fell in action on the Western Front on 14 June 1915 as a subaltern with the 1/8th (City of London) of the London Regiment (Post Office Rifles), at the age of 24 years. He had been in France on active service for nineteen days before meeting his death. His body was buried in Fosse 7 Military Cemetery (Quality Street), Mazingarbe.

In July 1917 Field Marshal Edmund Allenby was informed of the death in action of his son Michael Allenby, leading to Allenby's break down in tears in public while he recited a poem by Rupert Brooke.

Commemorations

On 11 November 1985, Brooke was among 16 First World War poets commemorated on a slate monument unveiled in Poets' Corner in Westminster Abbey. The inscription on the stone was written by a fellow war poet, Wilfred Owen. It reads: "My subject is War, and the pity of War. The Poetry is in the pity."

The wooden cross that marked Brooke's grave on Skyros, which was painted and carved with his name, was removed when a permanent memorial was made there. His mother, Mary Ruth Brooke, had the cross brought to Rugby, to the family plot at Clifton Road Cemetery. Because of erosion in the open air, it was removed from the cemetery in 2008 and replaced by a more permanent marker. The Skyros cross is now at Rugby School with the memorials of other Old Rugbeians.

The first stanza of "The Dead" is inscribed onto the base of the Royal Naval Division War Memorial in London.

The Cenotaph in Wellington, New Zealand, has the words from "The Dead","These laid the world away; poured out the red Sweet wine of youth; gave up the years to be Of work and joy, and that unhoped serene, That men call age; and those who would have been, Their sons, they gave, their immortality" inscribed on the pediment.

In 1988, the sculptor Ivor Roberts-Jones was commissioned to produce a statue of Brooke at Regent Place, a small triangular open space, in his birth town of Rugby, Warwickshire. The statue was unveiled by Mary Archer.

American adventurer Richard Halliburton made preparations for writing a biography of Brooke, meeting his mother and others who had known the poet, and corresponding widely and collecting copious notes, but he died before writing the manuscript. Halliburton's notes were used by Arthur Springer to write Red Wine of Youth: A Biography of Rupert Brooke.

However, in 1919, Lord Alfred Douglas (in the afterword of his Collected Poems) wrote: "... never before in the history of English literature has poetry sunk so low. When a nation which has produced Shakespeare and Marlowe and Chaucer and Milton and Shelley and Wordsworth and Byron and Keats and Tennyson and Blake can seriously lash itself into enthusiasm over the puerile crudities (when they are nothing worse) of a Rupert Brooke, it simply means that poetry is despised and dishonoured and that sane criticism is dead or moribund."

In popular culture
 Frederick Septimus Kelly wrote his "Elegy, In Memoriam Rupert Brooke for harp and strings" after attending Brooke's death and funeral. He also took Brooke's notebooks containing important late poems for safekeeping and later returned them to England.
Brooke was an inspiration to John Gillespie Magee Jr., who attended Rugby a generation later and won the same poetry prize as his predecessor. Magee is best known for his poems "High Flight" and "Sonnet to Rupert Brooke". 
F. Scott Fitzgerald's debut novel, This Side of Paradise (1920), opens with the quotation "Well this side of Paradise!… There's little comfort in the wise. — Rupert Brooke". Rupert Brooke is also referenced in other parts of the book.
Dutch composer Marjo Tal set several of Brooke's poems to music.
Charles Ives set to music a portion of Brooke's poem "The Old Vicarage, Grantchester" in his 114 Songs published in 1921.
A saying by Brooke was mentioned in Princess Elizabeth's Act of Dedication speech on her 21st birthday in 1947: "Let us say with Rupert Brooke, now God be thanked who has matched us with this hour."
 The opening two stanzas of his poem "Dust" were set to music by the pop group Fleetwood Mac and appear on their 1972 album Bare Trees.
In a 1974 episode of the TV series M*A*S*H, "Springtime", Cpl. Klinger reads from a book of Brooke's poems, which he won in a poker game. Later, Radar uses the book to try to seduce a nurse, mispronouncing the author's name as "Ruptured Brook".
"Is There Honey Still for Tea?" is the third episode of the eighth series of Dad's Army, 1975
Brooke is a prominent figure in the movie "Making Love", 1982. His poetry is cited as being a favourite of the lead characters and a child is named after him in the epilogue.
In the fourth and final episode of the 2003 BBC series Cambridge Spies, British-Soviet spy Kim Philby recites the final line from Brooke's "The Old Vicarage, Grantchester" along with his then wife, Aileen Furse.
The novel The Stranger's Child (2011) by Alan Hollinghurst features fictional war poet Cecil Valance, who shares characteristics of, though is not as talented as, Brooke.
Brooke is a minor character in A. S. Byatt's novel The Children's Book (2009).
"Lithuania" a drama in one act, by Rupert Brooke was made into Feature Film in India. Aa Karaala Ratri (2018) Kannada and Kondraal Paavam (2023) in Tamil.

See also

List of Bloomsbury Group people

References
Notes

General references

Brooke, Rupert, Letters From America with a Preface by Henry James (London: Sidgwick & Jackson, Ltd, 1916; repr. 1947).
Dawson, Jill, The Great Lover (London: Sceptre, 1990). A historical novel about Brooke and his relationship with a Tahitian woman, Taatamata, in 1913–14 and with Nell Golightly a maid where he was living.
Delany, Paul. "Fatal Glamour: the Life of Rupert Brooke." (Montreal: McGillQueens UP, 2015).
Paul Delany. "The Neo-Pagans: Friendship and Love in the Rupert Brooke Circle" (Macmillan 1987)
Keith Hale, ed. Friends and Apostles: The Correspondence of Rupert Brooke-James Strachey, 1905–1914.
Halliburton, Richard, The Glorious Adventure (New York and Indianapolis: Bobbs-Merrill, 1927).  Traveller/travel writer Halliburton, in recreating Odysseus' adventures, visits the grave of Brooke on the Greek island of Skyros.
Christopher Hassall. "Rupert Brooke: A Biography" (Faber and Faber 1964)
 
Sir Geoffrey Keynes, ed. "The Letters of Rupert Brooke" (Faber and Faber 1968)
John Lehmann. "Rupert Brooke: His Life and His Legend" (George Weidenfeld & Nicolson Ltd 1980)
Sellers Leonard. The Hood Battalion - Royal Naval Division. Leo Cooper, Pen & Sword Books Ltd. 1995, Select Edition 2003  - Rupert Brooke was an officer of Hood Battalion, 2nd Brigade, Royal Naval Division.
Gerry Max, Horizon Chasers – The Lives and Adventures of Richard Halliburton and Paul Mooney  (McFarland, c2007).  References are made to the poet throughout.  Quoted, p. 11.
Gerry Max, "'When Youth Kept Open House' – Richard Halliburton and Thomas Wolfe",  North Carolina Literary Review, 1996, Issue Number 5.  Two early 20th century writers and their debt to the poet.
Moran, Sean Farrell, "Patrick Pearse and the European Revolt Against Reason", The Journal of the History of Ideas,50,4,423-66
Morley, Christopher, "Rupert Brooke" in Shandygaff – A number of most agreeable Inquirendoes upon Life & Letters, interspersed with Short Stories & Skits, the Whole Most Diverting to the Reader (New York: Garden City Publishing Company, 1918), pp. 58–71. An important early reminiscence and appraisal by famed essayist and novelist Morley.
Mike Read. "Forever England: The Life of Rupert Brooke" (Mainstream Publishing Company Ltd 1997)
Timothy Rogers. "Rupert Brooke: A Reappraisal and Selection" (Routledge, 1971)
Robert Scoble. The Corvo Cult: The History of an Obsession (Strange Attractor, 2014)
Christian Soleil. "Rupert Brooke: Sous un ciel anglais" (Edifree, France, 2009)
Christian Soleil. "Rupert Brooke: L'Ange foudroyé" (Monpetitediteur, France, 2011)
Arthur Stringer. Red Wine of Youth—A Biography of Rupert Brooke (New York: Bobbs-Merrill, 1952).  Partly based on extensive correspondence between American travel writer Richard Halliburton and the literary and salon figures who had known Brooke.
Colin Wilson. "Poetry & Mysticism" (City Lights Books 1969). Contains a chapter about Rupert Brooke.

External links

 Rupert Brooke Society
 Rupert Brooke on Skyros
 Schroder Collection (Rupert Brooke), Cambridge University Digital Library, digitised correspondence etc. between Brooke, Edward Marsh, and William Denis Browne
 Rupert Brooke profile and poems on Poets.org
 Rupert Brooke on Poemist
 
 
 
 Bartleby.com – Collected Poems
 Rupert Brooke at the Commonwealth War Graves Commission database
 Rupert Brooke Correspondence and Writings at Dartmouth College Library

1887 births
1915 deaths
20th-century English male writers
20th-century English poets
Alumni of King's College, Cambridge
Bisexual men
Burials in Greece
Deaths from sepsis
English male poets
English World War I poets
Fellows of King's College, Cambridge
Infectious disease deaths in Greece
English LGBT poets
British bisexual writers
Members of the Fabian Society
People educated at Rugby School
People from Grantchester
People from Rugby, Warwickshire
Royal Naval Volunteer Reserve personnel of World War I
Royal Navy officers of World War I
Skyros
Sonneteers
War writers
Deaths due to insect bites and stings
British military personnel killed in World War I
Lost Generation writers
Military personnel from Warwickshire